Flavius Koczi (born 26 August 1987 in Reșița, Romania) is a Romanian artistic gymnast. He is a world silver medalist on vault and a ten-time European medalist (all around, pommel horse, vault, floor, and team). Koczi is the 2006 European champion on pommel horse, the 2011 European Champion on floor, 2012 European Champion on Vault and was one of the vault, team, and all around finalists at the 2008 Olympic Games and finalist at the floor and vault at the 2012 Olympic Games.

References

External links
 

1987 births
Living people
Sportspeople from Reșița
Romanian male artistic gymnasts
Gymnasts at the 2008 Summer Olympics
Gymnasts at the 2012 Summer Olympics
Medalists at the World Artistic Gymnastics Championships
Olympic gymnasts of Romania
European champions in gymnastics
Universiade medalists in gymnastics
Universiade gold medalists for Romania
Universiade bronze medalists for Romania
Medalists at the 2009 Summer Universiade
Medalists at the 2011 Summer Universiade
21st-century Romanian people